The North Carolina Music Hall of Fame is a non-profit organization and museum in Kannapolis, North Carolina that was created to honor musicians, composers and artists with ties to North Carolina that have made significant impact in the music industry. The museum serves as a clearinghouse for North Carolina musicians from all time periods, and preserves a number of memorabilia artifacts for public display.

In December 2014, the North Carolina Music Hall of Fame relocated to a new home within the Curb Museum for Music and Motorsports at 600 Dale Earnhardt Boulevard.

History
The organization was founded in 1994 by businessmen Doug Croft and Joe Carroll. Originally located in Thomasville, North Carolina, the group inducted seven people in 1999 and one in 2002. Suffering from a lack of space, a historic city jail in Kannapolis, North Carolina, was chosen as the new location. Full renovation began in 2008, with the museum completed 7 months later in 2009.

Much of the renewed interest in the NC Music Hall of Fame was driven by music industry mogul Mike Curb who has ties to Kannapolis and is friends with David Murdock who was building the Kannapolis-based North Carolina Research Campus. He worked out a deal to lease and renovate the old city jail and police station. Curb also has his close friend and North Carolina native, music executive Eddie Ray, become operations director to oversee the day-to-day for the organization.

Mike Curb and Eddie Ray were both inducted into the Hall in 2009. Mike Curb for his contribution and support of the Hall of Fame and Eddie Ray for his lifetime achievement in the music non-performer category.

In 2012, the organization hosted its third induction ceremony which was open to the public. Being held at the Vintage Motor Club Conference & Events Center in nearby Concord, North Carolina allowed the group to sell tickets to the event.

Criteria for inclusion
Musicians that were either born in North Carolina or have made it their home are eligible for induction 10 years after their entry into the music industry. Inductees are not limited to music performers, and producers, industry executives and educators are also eligible for induction.

Inductees
Some of the inductees include (with year inducted):

1999

Chairmen of the Board 
Charlie Daniels 
Bill Griffin
Kay Kyser 
Victoria Livengood
Loonis McGlohon 
Billy Scott

2002

Ronnie Milsap

2009

The "5" Royales
Johnny Bristol
George Clinton 
John Coltrane 
Roberta Flack 
Johnny Grant 
Wilbert Harrison 
Ben E. King 
Thelonious Monk
Clyde McPhatter 
Eddie Ray 
Max Roach 
Earl Scruggs 
Nina Simone 
Kate Smith 
James Taylor 
Randy Travis 

Honorary member
Mike Curb - Honorary member (2009)

2010

Les Brown 
Shirley Caesar 
Donna Fargo 
Don Gibson
Andy Griffith 
George Hamilton IV
Oliver 
Don Schlitz 
Curly Seckler
Arthur "Guitar Boogie" Smith 
Billy Taylor 
Doc Watson 
Maurice Williams

2011

Billy "Crash" Craddock (2011)
Michael English 
Ben Folds
Anthony Dean Griffey
John D. Loudermilk 
Clyde Moody 
Maceo Parker 
Billy Edd Wheeler

2012

Tori Amos 
Lou Donaldson 
Fred Foster
Stonewall Jackson 
Jodeci 
J. E. Mainer 
Nantucket 
Shirley Reeves & Doris Jackson

2013

Alicia Bridges
Tony Brown
Rick Dees
The Catalinas
John P. Kee
Del Reeves
Grady Tate
Willie Weeks

2014

Clay Aiken 
Fantasia Barrino 
Jimmy Capps 
The Embers
Little Eva
Lulu Belle and Scotty 
Tab Smith 
Link Wray

2015

Gerald Alston 
Nappy Brown 
Eric Church
The Fantastic Shakers
Warren Haynes 
Chuck Jackson 
Reverend Fairthcolth Barnes 
Jay Spell

2016

The Avett Brothers 
Band of Oz
Chuck Brown 
Carolina Chocolate Drops 
Percy Heath 
David Holt
Kellie Pickler
Ron Tyson

2017

Anthony Hamilton 
Bucky Covington
Etta Baker 
Jim Lauderdale 
Richard Lewis Spencer 
Sensational Nightingales 
Steep Canyon Rangers

2018

Blind Boy Fuller
Calvin Richardson
Chris Daughtry
Dolphus Ramseur
John Tesh
Luther Barnes
The Hoppers

2019

Elizabeth Cotten
Merle Watson
Mitch Easter
9th Wonder
Big Daddy Kane

2020

The Briar-Hoppers
Donald Lawrence
The Squirrel Nut Zippers
Michael Mauldin (producer)
Jermaine Dupri
Charles Whitfield

Inductees are from virtually every genre of music, including Jazz, Opera, Hip Hop, Blues, Rock, Folk, Country, and Bluegrass.

See also
 
 List of music museums

References

External links

Eddie Ray Interview NAMM Oral History Program (2013)

Museums in Cabarrus County, North Carolina
Music halls of fame
Music museums in North Carolina
State halls of fame in the United States
History museums in North Carolina
Halls of fame in North Carolina